Untitled Totem Pole (also known as simply Untitled or Totem Pole) is a 1984 cedar totem pole created by James Bender and Marvin Oliver, installed in Seattle's Victor Steinbrueck Park, in the U.S. state of Washington.

Description and history
Oliver and Bender designed the  totem based on Haida imagery, and Bender carved the sculpture. The top of the totem depicts a raven holding a Salish spinning whorl. Below the raven are human figures, a killer whale with a protruding dorsal fin, another smaller raven, and a bear holding a hawk. The pole is mounted on a concrete base and supported by a steel beam.

See also

 1984 in art

References

1984 establishments in Washington (state)
1984 sculptures
Bears in art
Sculptures of birds in the United States
Downtown Seattle
Haida
Outdoor sculptures in Seattle
Sculptures of men in Washington (state)
Sculptures of women in Washington (state)
Totem poles in the United States
Whales in art
Wooden sculptures in Washington (state)